Lotfabad is a city in Razavi Khorasan Province, Iran.

Lotfabad may refer to:
 Lotfabad, East Azerbaijan
 Lotfabad, Anar, Kerman Province
 Lotfabad, Anbarabad, Kerman Province
 Lotfabad, Narmashir, Kerman Province
 Lotfabad, Rafsanjan, Kerman Province
 Lotfabad, Sardasht, Dezful County, Khuzestan Province
 Lotfabad, Seyyedvaliyeddin, Dezful County, Khuzestan Province
 Lotfabad, Nishapur, Razavi Khorasan Province
 Lotfabad District, in Razavi Khorasan Province